Michael Mullen is an Irish novelist, children's author and historian based in Mayo. He has published titles including "Hungry Land", "House of Mirrors" and "The Golden Key". He is the recipient of the Wild Atlantic Words first Appreciation Award.

Publications
 The Road Taken: A Guide to the Roads and Scenery of Mayo (1 March 2008)
 Mayo: The Waters and the Wild by Michael Mullen and John P. McHugh (15 November 2004)
 To Hell or Connaught (24 February 1994)
 The Hungry Land (25 February 1993)
 The Viking Princess (December 1990)
 Festival of Fools (1984)
 Kelly: A Novel (December 1981)

References

External links
 Portraits of Irish-Language Writers - Michael Mullen 
 ‘Out and About’ was broadcast on 23 June 1987 with Michael Mullen discussing the history of Castlebar

Living people
People from County Mayo
People from Castlebar
20th-century Irish novelists
Year of birth missing (living people)
Irish children's writers
Irish historical novelists
20th-century Irish historians